The Newton Public School District is a comprehensive community public school district serving students in pre-kindergarten through twelfth grade from Newton, in Sussex County, New Jersey, United States. The district's enrollment includes high school students from Andover Borough and Andover and Green townships, who attend the high school as part of sending/receiving relationships.

As of the 2018–19 school year, the district, comprising three schools, had an enrollment of 1,546 students and 139.0 classroom teachers (on an FTE basis), for a student–teacher ratio of 11.1:1.

The district is classified by the New Jersey Department of Education as being in District Factor Group "CD", the sixth-highest of eight groupings. District Factor Groups organize districts statewide to allow comparison by common socioeconomic characteristics of the local districts. From lowest socioeconomic status to highest, the categories are A, B, CD, DE, FG, GH, I and J. Despite its District Factor Group, Newton has been considered the top school district in Sussex County, registering the highest test scores in the county.

Schools
Schools in the district (with 2018–19 enrollment data from the National Center for Education Statistics) are:
Elementary school
Merriam Avenue School with 475 students in grades PreK-4
Kevin Stanton, Principal
Kenney Lutz, Assistant Principal
Middle school

Halsted Middle School with 345 students in grades 5-8
Kristi Greene, Principal
Angela Dunbar, Assistant Principal
High school
Newton High School with 715 students in grades 9-12
Jeffrey Waldron, Principal
Samantha Castro, Assistant Principal
Ryan Hashway, Assistant Principal / Athletic Director

Administration
Core members of the district's administration are:
Dr. G. Kennedy Greene, Superintendent
Alfred Savio, Business Administrator / Board Secretary

Board of education
The district's board of education, with nine members, sets policy and oversees the fiscal and educational operation of the district through its administration. As a Type II school district, the board's trustees are elected directly by voters to serve three-year terms of office on a staggered basis, with three seats up for election each year held (since 2012) as part of the November general election. In addition to the nine elected members, the board includes one appointed representative from Andover Township and one from Green Township.

References

External links
Newton Public School District

Newton Public School District, National Center for Education Statistics

New Jersey District Factor Group CD
Newton, New Jersey
School districts in Sussex County, New Jersey